Xyleutes benestriata is a moth in the family Cossidae. It is found on the Bahamas.

References

Zeuzerinae
Moths described in 1904